Chuchkovsky District is an administrative and municipal district (raion), one of the twenty-five in Ryazan Oblast, Russia. It is located in the eastern central part of the oblast. Its administrative center is the urban locality (a work settlement) of Chuchkovo. Population: 8,700 (2010 Census);  The population of Chuchkovo accounts for 35.9% of the district's total population.

Notable residents 

Viktor Ivankov (1924–2021), Soviet military officer, born in Antonovo

References

Notes

Sources

Districts of Ryazan Oblast